The Elizabeth Braves were an American basketball team based in Elizabeth, New Jersey that was a member of the American Basketball League.

The team moved to Hartford to become the Hartford Hurricanes during the 1947/48 season on December 19, 1947.

Year-by-year

Basketball teams in New Jersey